Rafael Souza dos Anjos (born October 26, 1984) is a Brazilian American professional mixed martial artist. He currently competes in the Welterweight and Lightweight divisions in the Ultimate Fighting Championship (UFC). He is a former UFC Lightweight Champion and a former top contender in the Welterweight division. As of January 17, 2023, he is #9 in the UFC lightweight rankings.

Early life
In a 2014 interview, dos Anjos stated that he was a troubled child, getting into fights in his hometown Niterói, Rio de Janeiro. He originally started training Brazilian jiu-jitsu under Daniel Matheus at the age of nine. According to dos Anjos, he stopped fighting on the streets when he began training jiu jitsu.

Mixed martial arts career
The majority of dos Anjos' early career took place in his native country of Brazil. He started off his career with a record of 2-2, with both losses coming by way of split decision. dos Anjos then racked up 9 straight victories, which included 6 submissions. His 11–2 record in regional circuits was enough to get a call from the UFC.

Ultimate Fighting Championship
dos Anjos made his UFC debut at UFC 91, losing to Jeremy Stephens. The fight was stopped in the third round after an uppercut knocked out dos Anjos.

For his second UFC fight, dos Anjos faced Tyson Griffin at UFC Fight Night 18. dos Anjos lost the back-and-forth battle via unanimous decision. The bout was awarded Fight of the Night honors.

dos Anjos was scheduled to fight Matt Wiman on September 19, 2009, at UFC 103, but due to a knee injury suffered by Wiman, he instead faced Rob Emerson. dos Anjos got a much-needed win by unanimous decision.

dos Anjos then defeated Kyle Bradley via unanimous decision at UFC Fight Night 20.

At UFC 112, dos Anjos defeated Terry Etim via second round armbar submission, earning him Submission of the Night honors.

dos Anjos faced Clay Guida on August 7, 2010, at UFC 117. Guida appeared to injure the jaw of dos Anjos in the first round with a hook and would go on to defeat dos Anjos by submission (jaw injury) after dos Anjos tapped from the pressure being applied to his jaw while Guida had arm-and-head control.

dos Anjos next faced George Sotiropoulos on July 2, 2011, at UFC 132 after replacing an injured Evan Dunham. Dos Anjos showcased his vastly improved striking skills, knocking out Sotiropoulos cold in the first round with a right hand.

dos Anjos faced Gleison Tibau on November 19, 2011, at UFC 139. He lost the fight via split decision.

dos Anjos faced Kamal Shalorus on May 15, 2012, at UFC on Fuel TV: The Korean Zombie vs. Poirier. After dropping Shalorus with a head kick, dos Anjos submitted him via rear-naked choke in the first round.

After taking virtually no damage in the fight against Shalorus, dos Anjos quickly returned to face Anthony Njokuani on July 11, 2012, at UFC on Fuel TV: Munoz vs. Weidman, replacing an injured Paul Taylor. He won the fight via unanimous decision, dominating Njokuani both in striking and grappling.

dos Anjos faced Mark Bocek on November 17, 2012, at UFC 154. He won the fight via unanimous decision, once again having the edge in both standup and ground fighting.

dos Anjos next faced Evan Dunham on May 18, 2013, at UFC on FX 8. He won the fight via unanimous decision. However, there was some controversy, as 10 out of 10 media outlets scored the bout in favor of Dunham.

dos Anjos faced Donald Cerrone on August 28, 2013, at UFC Fight Night 27. He won the fight via unanimous decision.

dos Anjos was expected to face Rustam Khabilov on February 22, 2014, at UFC 170. However, the bout was scrapped in the weeks leading up to the event. dos Anjos instead faced Khabib Nurmagomedov on April 19, 2014, at UFC on Fox 11. He lost the fight via unanimous decision.

dos Anjos faced Jason High on June 7, 2014, at UFC Fight Night 42. He won the fight via TKO in the second round.

dos Anjos headlined UFC Fight Night 49 against former lightweight champion Benson Henderson on August 23, 2014. He won the fight via knockout in the first round after dropping Henderson with a flying knee and rendering him unconscious with a follow-up left hook. The win also earned him his first Performance of the Night bonus award and made him the only man to stop Henderson by strikes.

dos Anjos faced Nate Diaz on December 13, 2014, at UFC on Fox 13. He won the fight by unanimous decision. He dominated the first two rounds with superior striking and vicious leg kicks with the third round being controlled by dos Anjos on the mat.

UFC Lightweight Championship
dos Anjos faced Anthony Pettis for the UFC Lightweight Championship on March 14, 2015, at UFC 185. dos Anjos won the bout via unanimous decision in a dominant fashion. After the fight, dos Anjos revealed that he had torn his MCL only a few weeks before the bout. The win once again earned him a Performance of the Night bonus award.

For his first title defense, dos Anjos rematched Donald Cerrone in the main event of UFC on Fox 17 on December 19, 2015. He won the fight via TKO at just 66 seconds into the first round, resulting in the fastest finish in UFC Lightweight title history. The win also earned dos Anjos his third Performance of the Night bonus award.

dos Anjos was expected to face Conor McGregor on March 5, 2016, at UFC 196 for his second title defense of the lightweight belt. However, it was announced on February 23 that dos Anjos had been forced out of the fight after breaking his foot during training.

In his second title defense, dos Anjos faced Eddie Alvarez on July 7, 2016, at UFC Fight Night 90. Despite closing as a three-to-one favorite to win the fight, he lost the bout via TKO in the first round. Reports arose after the Alvarez fight that dos Anjos had passed out for three minutes moments before going out to fight, and that this was due to the effects of the gruelling weight cut.

Post championship
dos Anjos next faced Tony Ferguson on November 5, 2016, at The Ultimate Fighter Latin America 3 Finale. He lost the fight via unanimous decision. Both participants were awarded Fight of the Night for their performance.

Move to Welterweight 
dos Anjos faced Tarec Saffiedine, former Strikeforce title holder, in a welterweight bout on June 17, 2017, at UFC Fight Night: Holm vs. Correia. He won the fight via unanimous decision (30–27, 30–27, and 29–28).

dos Anjos faced Neil Magny on September 9, 2017, at UFC 215. He won the fight via arm-triangle choke submission in the first round.  This win also earned dos Anjos his fourth Performance of the Night bonus award.

In a title eliminator, dos Anjos faced Robbie Lawler on December 16, 2017, in the main event at UFC on Fox: Lawler vs. dos Anjos. dos Anjos' fight plan relied heavily on low leg kicks and constant combos consisting of body shots and leg kicks. He won the fight by unanimous decision.

dos Anjos fought Colby Covington on June 9, 2018, at UFC 225 for the Interim UFC Welterweight Championship. He lost the fight by unanimous decision.

dos Anjos faced Kamaru Usman on November 30, 2018, at The Ultimate Fighter 28 Finale. He lost the fight via unanimous decision.

dos Anjos faced Kevin Lee in Lee's welterweight debut at UFC Fight Night 152 on May 18, 2019. He won the fight via an arm triangle submission in the fourth round.

dos Anjos faced Leon Edwards on July 20, 2019, at UFC on ESPN 4. He lost the fight via unanimous decision.

dos Anjos faced Michael Chiesa on January 25, 2020, at UFC Fight Night 166. He lost the fight via unanimous decision.

Return to Lightweight
dos Anjos was expected to face Islam Makhachev on October 24, 2020, in dos Anjos' return to the lightweight division at UFC 254. However, on October 8, 2020, it was reported that dos Anjos tested positive for COVID-19 and he was removed from the bout. The pairing was left intact and rescheduled for November 14, 2020, at UFC Fight Night: Felder vs. dos Anjos.  However, on November 8, it was reported that Makhachev was forced to pull from the event due to injuries. On a quick turnaround, it was announced that Paul Felder stepped up to replace Makhachev on five days notice. Simultaneously, dos Anjos signed a new six-fight contract with the UFC and committed to compete in the lightweight division. dos Anjos went on to defeat Felder via split decision. This fight earned him the Fight of the Night awards. The bout with Makhachev was rescheduled and was expected to take place on October 30, 2021, at UFC 267. However, yet again, dos Anjos was forced to pulled from the event, citing injury, and was replaced by Dan Hooker.

dos Anjos was scheduled to face Rafael Fiziev on February 19, 2022, at UFC Fight Night 201. However, the bout was postponed to UFC 272 due to visa issues with Fiziev. One week before the event, Fiziev was forced to withdraw due to testing positive for COVID-19, and was replaced by Renato Moicano on just 4 days notice at a catchweight of 160 pounds. dos Anjos won the fight via unanimous decision.

The bout against Fiziev was rescheduled for the third time for UFC on ESPN: dos Anjos vs. Fiziev on July 9, 2022. He lost the fight via knockout in round five.

Return to Welterweight
Dos Anjos faced Bryan Barberena in a welterweight bout on December 3, 2022 at  UFC on ESPN 42. He won via neck crank in the second round. From this bout, Dos Anjos surpassed Frankie Edgar for longest fight time and is the first fighter to reach 8 hours of fight time in UFC history.

Fighting style
Dos Anjos is known for his aggressive, high-volume striking, physical strength, and strong takedown capabilities. He will often come out aggressively in a Muay Thai stance, then use feints and kicks to back his opponent against the cage while swarming them with flurries of punches as well as takedowns. He is particularly noted for his left kick to the body and right hook to the head; he uses these strikes to limit his opponent's lateral movement as they attempt to get their backs away from the fence. Under trainer Jason Parillo, dos Anjos developed a refined boxing game in 2017. On the ground, he is noted for his powerful ground-and-pound, which includes punches and sharp elbow strikes. In addition to his striking, dos Anjos is a high-level black belt in Brazilian jiu-jitsu.

Dos Anjos trains out of Evolve MMA in Singapore and at Team RDA in California; he formerly trained at Kings MMA but left after losing to Eddie Alvarez. He is a Brazilian jiu-jitsu black belt under Aldo "Caveirinha" Januário.

Personal life
After receiving a broken jaw in the Guida fight, dos Anjos now has a titanium fused jaw that he claims has broken some hands of later opponents. Dr. Johnny Benjamin has disagreed with dos Anjos, pointing out that the titanium plate in his jaw is measured in millimeters.

Dos Anjos is a Christian. Dos Anjos has three children with his wife, Cris. On December 20, 2019, dos Anjos revealed on social media that he and his family have become naturalized U.S. citizens.

Championships and achievements
Ultimate Fighting Championship
UFC Lightweight Championship (One time)
One successful title defense
Fight of the Night (Three times) 
Submission of the Night (One time) 
Performance of the Night (Four times) 
Longest total fight time in UFC history (8:01:49)
Most unanimous decision wins in UFC history (11)
Tied (Francisco Trinaldo) for most unanimous decision wins in UFC Lightweight history (7)
First and only fighter to reach 8 hours of fight time in UFC history
Tied (Charles Oliveira, Dustin Poirier & Jon Jones) for fifth most wins in UFC history (21)
Second most decision fights in UFC history (20)
Tied (Demian Maia) for sixth most bouts in UFC history (33)
Fight Matrix
Lineal MMA Lightweight Champion (One time, Former)

Submission grappling

Brazilian jiu-jitsu
World Jiu-Jitsu Championship
2003 Purple Belt Peso Leve: 1st Place
Brazilian National Jiu-Jitsu Championship
2004 Brown Belt Peso Leve: 3rd Place
2005 Brown Belt Peso Leve: 3rd place
European Championship
2006 Black Belt Peso Leve: 3rd place

Mixed martial arts record

|-
|Win
|align=center|32–14
|Bryan Barberena
|Submission (neck crank)
|UFC on ESPN: Thompson vs. Holland
|
|align=center|2
|align=center|3:20
|Orlando, Florida, United States
|
|-
|Loss
|align=center|31–14
|Rafael Fiziev
|KO (punches)
|UFC on ESPN: dos Anjos vs. Fiziev
|
|align=center|5
|align=center|0:18
|Las Vegas, Nevada, United States
|
|-
|Win
|align=center|31–13
|Renato Moicano
|Decision (unanimous)
|UFC 272
|
|align=center|5
|align=center|5:00
|Las Vegas, Nevada, United States
|
|-
|Win
|align=center|30–13
|Paul Felder
|Decision (split)
|UFC Fight Night: Felder vs. dos Anjos
|
|align=center|5
|align=center|5:00
|Las Vegas, Nevada, United States
|
|-
|Loss
|align=center|29–13
|Michael Chiesa
|Decision (unanimous)
|UFC Fight Night: Blaydes vs. dos Santos
|
|align=center|3
|align=center|5:00
|Raleigh, North Carolina, United States
|
|-
|Loss
|align=center|29–12
|Leon Edwards
|Decision (unanimous)
|UFC on ESPN: dos Anjos vs. Edwards
|
|align=center|5
|align=center|5:00
|San Antonio, Texas, United States
|
|-
|Win
|align=center|29–11
|Kevin Lee
|Submission (arm-triangle choke)
|UFC Fight Night: dos Anjos vs. Lee
|
|align=center|4
|align=center|3:47
|Rochester, New York, United States
|
|-
|Loss
|align=center|28–11
|Kamaru Usman
|Decision (unanimous)
|The Ultimate Fighter: Heavy Hitters Finale
|
|align=center|5
|align=center|5:00
|Las Vegas, Nevada, United States 
|
|-
|Loss
|align=center|28–10
|Colby Covington
|Decision (unanimous)
|UFC 225
|
|align=center|5
|align=center|5:00
|Chicago, Illinois, United States
|
|-
|Win
|align=center|28–9
|Robbie Lawler
|Decision (unanimous)
|UFC on Fox: Lawler vs. dos Anjos
|
|align=center|5
|align=center|5:00
|Winnipeg, Manitoba, Canada
|
|-
|Win
|align=center|27–9
|Neil Magny
|Submission (arm-triangle choke)
|UFC 215
|
|align=center|1
|align=center|3:43
|Edmonton, Alberta, Canada
|
|-
|Win
|align=center|26–9
|Tarec Saffiedine
|Decision (unanimous)
|UFC Fight Night: Holm vs. Correia
|
|align=center|3
|align=center|5:00
|Kallang, Singapore
|
|-
|Loss 
|align=center|25–9
|Tony Ferguson
|Decision (unanimous)
|The Ultimate Fighter Latin America 3 Finale: dos Anjos vs. Ferguson
|
|align=center|5
|align=center|5:00
|Mexico City, Mexico
|
|-
|Loss
|align=center|25–8
|Eddie Alvarez
|TKO (punches)
|UFC Fight Night: dos Anjos vs. Alvarez
|
|align=center|1
|align=center|3:49
|Las Vegas, Nevada, United States
|
|-
|Win
|align=center|25–7
|Donald Cerrone
|TKO (punches)
|UFC on Fox: dos Anjos vs. Cowboy 2
|
|align=center|1
|align=center|1:06
|Orlando, Florida, United States
|
|-
|Win
|align=center|24–7
|Anthony Pettis
|Decision (unanimous)
|UFC 185
|
|align=center|5
|align=center|5:00
|Dallas, Texas, United States
|
|-
|Win
|align=center|23–7
|Nate Diaz
|Decision (unanimous)
|UFC on Fox: dos Santos vs. Miocic
|
|align=center|3
|align=center|5:00
|Phoenix, Arizona, United States
|
|-
|Win
|align=center|22–7
|Benson Henderson
|KO (punch)
|UFC Fight Night: Henderson vs. dos Anjos
|
|align=center|1
|align=center|2:32
|Tulsa, Oklahoma, United States
|
|-
|Win
|align=center|21–7
|Jason High
|TKO (punches)
|UFC Fight Night: Henderson vs. Khabilov
|
|align=center|2
|align=center|3:36
|Albuquerque, New Mexico, United States
|
|-
|Loss
|align=center|20–7
|Khabib Nurmagomedov
|Decision (unanimous)
|UFC on Fox: Werdum vs. Browne
|
|align=center|3
|align=center|5:00
|Orlando, Florida, United States
|
|-
|  Win
| align=center| 20–6
| Donald Cerrone
| Decision (unanimous)
| UFC Fight Night: Condit vs. Kampmann 2
| 
| align=center| 3
| align=center| 5:00
| Indianapolis, Indiana, United States
|
|-
| Win
| align=center| 19–6
| Evan Dunham
| Decision (unanimous)
| UFC on FX: Belfort vs. Rockhold
| 
| align=center| 3
| align=center| 5:00
| Jaraguá do Sul, Brazil
|
|-
| Win
| align=center| 18–6
| Mark Bocek
| Decision (unanimous)
| UFC 154
| 
| align=center| 3
| align=center| 5:00
| Montreal, Quebec, Canada
|
|-
| Win
| align=center| 17–6
| Anthony Njokuani
| Decision (unanimous)
| UFC on Fuel TV: Muñoz vs. Weidman
| 
| align=center| 3
| align=center| 5:00
| San Jose, California, United States
|
|-
| Win
| align=center| 16–6
| Kamal Shalorus
| Submission (rear-naked choke)
| UFC on Fuel TV: The Korean Zombie vs. Poirier
| 
| align=center| 1
| align=center| 1:40
| Fairfax, Virginia, United States
| 
|-
| Loss
| align=center| 15–6
| Gleison Tibau
| Decision (split)
| UFC 139
| 
| align=center| 3
| align=center| 5:00
| San Jose, California, United States
|
|-
| Win
| align=center| 15–5
| George Sotiropoulos
| KO (punch)
| UFC 132
| 
| align=center| 1
| align=center| 0:59
| Las Vegas, Nevada, United States
|
|-
| Loss
| align=center| 14–5
| Clay Guida
| TKO (jaw injury)
| UFC 117
| 
| align=center| 3
| align=center| 1:51
| Oakland, California, United States
|
|-
| Win
| align=center| 14–4
| Terry Etim
| Submission (armbar)
| UFC 112
| 
| align=center| 2
| align=center| 4:30
| Abu Dhabi, United Arab Emirates
| 
|-
| Win
| align=center| 13–4
| Kyle Bradley
| Decision (unanimous)
| UFC Fight Night: Maynard vs. Diaz
| 
| align=center| 3
| align=center| 5:00
| Fairfax, Virginia, United States
|
|-
| Win
| align=center| 12–4
| Rob Emerson
| Decision (unanimous)
| UFC 103
| 
| align=center| 3
| align=center| 5:00
| Dallas, Texas, United States
|
|-
| Loss
| align=center| 11–4
| Tyson Griffin
| Decision (unanimous)
| UFC Fight Night: Condit vs. Kampmann
| 
| align=center| 3
| align=center| 5:00
| Nashville, Tennessee, United States
| 
|-
| Loss
| align=center| 11–3
| Jeremy Stephens
| KO (punches)
| UFC 91
| 
| align=center| 3
| align=center| 0:39
| Las Vegas, Nevada, United States
|
|-
| Win
| align=center| 11–2
| Takafumi Otsuka
| Decision (split)
| Fury FC 6: High Voltage
| 
| align=center| 3
| align=center| 5:00
| Rio de Janeiro, Brazil
|
|-
| Win
| align=center| 10–2
| Takaichi Hirayama
| Submission (armbar)
| Pancrase: Shining 5
| 
| align=center| 1
| align=center| 1:25
| Tokyo, Japan
|
|-
| Win
| align=center| 9–2
| Gabriel Veiga
| Decision (unanimous)
| Fury FC 5: Final Conflict
| 
| align=center| 3
| align=center| 5:00
| São Paulo, Brazil
|
|-
| Win
| align=center| 8–2
| Danilo Cherman
| Submission (kimura)
| Fury FC 4: High Voltage
| 
| align=center| 2
| align=center| 3:38
| Teresópolis, Brazil
|
|-
| Win
| align=center| 7–2
| Maurício Souza
| Submission (rear-naked choke)
| rowspan=2|XFC Brazil
| rowspan=2|
| align=center| 1
| align=center| 6:24
| rowspan=2|Rio de Janeiro, Brazil
|
|-
| Win
| align=center| 6–2
| Thiago Minu
| Submission (rear-naked choke)
| align=center| 1
| align=center| 7:28
|
|-
| Win
| align=center| 5–2
| Johil de Oliveira
| Submission (rear-naked choke)
| Juiz de Fora Fight 4
| 
| align=center| 1
| align=center| 2:50
| Juiz de Fora, Brazil
|
|-
| Win
| align=center| 4–2
| Mateus Trindade
| Decision (unanimous)
| Shooto Brazil 11
| 
| align=center| 3
| align=center| 5:00
| Rio de Janeiro, Brazil 
|
|-
| Win
| align=center| 3–2
| Diogo Oliveira
| Submission (armbar)
| Top Fighter MMA 2
| 
| align=center| 2
| align=center| N/A
| Rio de Janeiro, Brazil 
|
|-
| Loss
| align=center| 2–2
| Jorge Britto
| Decision (split)
| Arena BH Combat
| 
| align=center| 3
| align=center| 5:00
| Belo Horizonte, Brazil
|
|-
| Win
| align=center| 2–1
| Felipe Arinelli
| TKO (doctor stoppage)
| Juiz de Fora Fight 2
| 
| align=center| 2
| align=center| N/A
| Juiz de Fora, Brazil 
|
|-
| Win
| align=center| 1–1
| João Paulo Almeida 
| Decision (unanimous) 
| Arena BH
| 
| align=center| 3
| align=center| 5:00
| Belo Horizonte, Brazil
|
|-
| Loss
| align=center| 0–1
| Adriano Abu
| Decision (split)
| Juiz de Fora Fight 1
| 
| align=center| 3
| align=center| 5:00
| Juiz de Fora, Brazil 
|

See also
 List of current mixed martial arts champions
 List of current UFC fighters
 List of male mixed martial artists

References

External links 

Official UFC Profile

American male mixed martial artists
Brazilian male mixed martial artists
American Muay Thai practitioners
Brazilian Muay Thai practitioners
American practitioners of Brazilian jiu-jitsu
Brazilian emigrants to the United States
Brazilian practitioners of Brazilian jiu-jitsu
Lightweight mixed martial artists
Welterweight mixed martial artists
Mixed martial artists utilizing Muay Thai
Mixed martial artists utilizing Brazilian jiu-jitsu
Living people
1984 births
People awarded a black belt in Brazilian jiu-jitsu
Ultimate Fighting Championship champions
Brazilian Christians
Sportspeople from Niterói
Ultimate Fighting Championship male fighters
Naturalized citizens of the United States